Let's Dance 2011 is the sixth season of the Swedish version of Strictly Come Dancing, and was broadcast on the Swedish television channel TV4 starting on 7 January 2011.

Couples

Scoring chart

Red numbers indicate the lowest score for each week.
Green numbers indicate the highest score for each week.
 indicates the couple eliminated that week.
 indicates the returning couple that finished in the bottom two.
 indicates the winning couple.
 indicates the runner-up couple.
 indicates the third place couple.

 The first week did not eliminate any couple, instead it was announced who was in the bottom two going into Week 2.
 Since Week 1 was a non-elimination week, Week 2 featured a combined score of both Week 1 and 2, which was used in the final standings.
 Ann Wilson was unavailable to judge the show, so scores were out of 30 points.

Average chart

Average dance chart

Highest and lowest scoring performances 
The best and worst performances in each dance according to the judges' marks are as follows:

Dance schedule
The celebrities and professional partners danced one of these routines for each corresponding week.

Week 1: Cha-Cha-Cha or Waltz
Week 2: Rumba or Quickstep
Week 3: Jive or Tango
Week 4: Paso Doble or Slowfox
Week 5: Samba
Week 6: Cha-Cha-Cha or Waltz
Week 7: Rumba or Quickstep
Week 8: Jive or Tango and Rock 'n' Roll Marathon
Week 9: Paso Doble or Slowfox and Bonus Dance
Week 10: Salsa and Bugg

Songs

Week 1
Individual judges scores in charts below (given in parentheses) are listed in this order from left to right: Dermot Clemenger, Isabel Edvardsson, Ann Wilson and Tony Irving.

Running order

Week 2
Individual judges scores in charts below (given in parentheses) are listed in this order from left to right: Dermot Clemenger, Isabel Edvardsson, Ann Wilson and Tony Irving.

Running order

Week 3
Individual judges scores in charts below (given in parentheses) are listed in this order from left to right: Dermot Clemenger, Isabel Edvardsson, Ann Wilson and Tony Irving.

Running order

Week 4
Individual judges scores in charts below (given in parentheses) are listed in this order from left to right: Dermot Clemenger, Isabel Edvardsson, Ann Wilson and Tony Irving.

Running order

Week 5
Individual judges scores in charts below (given in parentheses) are listed in this order from left to right: Dermot Clemenger, Isabel Edvardsson, Ann Wilson and Tony Irving.

Running order

Week 6
Individual judges scores in charts below (given in parentheses) are listed in this order from left to right: Dermot Clemenger, Isabel Edvardsson, Ann Wilson and Tony Irving.

Running order

Week 7
Individual judges scores in charts below (given in parentheses) are listed in this order from left to right: Dermot Clemenger, Isabel Edvardsson, and Tony Irving.

Ann Wilson was unavailable to judge the show, so scores were out of 30 points.

Running order

Week 8
Individual judges scores in charts below (given in parentheses) are listed in this order from left to right: Dermot Clemenger, Isabel Edvardsson, Ann Wilson and Tony Irving.

Running order

Week 9
Individual judges scores in charts below (given in parentheses) are listed in this order from left to right: Dermot Clemenger, Isabel Edvardsson, Ann Wilson and Tony Irving.

Running order

Week 10
Individual judges scores in charts below (given in parentheses) are listed in this order from left to right: Dermot Clemenger, Isabel Edvardsson, Ann Wilson and Tony Irving.

Running order

Week 11
Individual judges scores in charts below (given in parentheses) are listed in this order from left to right: Dermot Clemenger, Isabel Edvardsson, Ann Wilson and Tony Irving.

Running order

Week 12
Individual judges scores in charts below (given in parentheses) are listed in this order from left to right: Dermot Clemenger, Isabel Edvardsson, Ann Wilson and Tony Irving.

Running order

Call-out order
The table below lists the order in which the contestants' fates were revealed. The order of the safe couples does not reflect the viewer voting results.

 This couple came in first place with the judges.
 This couple came in last place with the judges.
 This couple came in last place with the judges and was eliminated.
 This couple was eliminated.
 This couple won the competition.
 This couple came in second in the competition.

Dance chart

 Highest Scoring Dance
 Lowest Scoring Dance
 Dances performed at the finale by previously eliminated celebrities

References
Official website of Let's Dance (Swedish)

2011
TV4 (Sweden) original programming
2011 Swedish television seasons